During the 2005–06 English football season, Crystal Palace F.C. competed in the Football League Championship, following relegation from the FA Premier League the previous season.

Season summary
Crystal Palace had been boosted by the decision by the Premiership's top English goalscorer of the previous season, Andrew Johnson, to remain with the Londoners to fire their bid for a return to the top flight. Although Johnson was less prolific this season, scoring only 15 goals, Palace reached the play-offs in sixth place – the position they had finished in the promotion season of 2004. Palace faced third-placed Watford in the semi-finals – they were comprehensively beaten 3–0 in the first leg, and were only able to draw the second leg 0–0, consigning Palace to another season in the Championship. Manager Iain Dowie was soon on his way out, leaving by mutual consent on 22 May. Dowie claimed he wanted to be closer to his family in the north; he would take up the vacancy at London rivals Charlton Athletic a mere eight days later. He was followed out of Selhurst Park by Johnson, who snubbed Wigan Athletic and Bolton Wanderers to join Everton for £8.6 million.

In June, Palace appointed Hull City manager (and former Palace winger) Peter Taylor as Dowie's successor.

Kit
Italian company Diadora remained Palace's kit manufacturers, and introduced a new home kit for the season. Unlike the previous season's kit, which was mainly red, the new kit was predominantly blue, complemented by a single thick red stripe down the centre of the shirt. For the club's centenary the club wore a commemorative kit on 27 July, 27 September and 22 October: the kit recalled one worn by the club in the 1970s, which featured white shorts and socks and a white shirt with two stripes of sky blue and claret (the club's original colours) in the centre.

Churchill Insurance remained kit sponsors for the sixth consecutive season.

Final league table

Squad statistics

Appearances and goals

Players with no appearances not included in the list

|-
|colspan="14"|Players left the club during the season:

|}
Source:

Results
Crystal Palace's score comes first

Legend

Football League Championship

Championship play-offs

FA Cup

League Cup

First-team squad

Left club during season

Transfers

In
  Darren Ward –  Millwall
  Jobi McAnuff –  Cardiff City
  Jonathan Macken –  Manchester City
  Marco Reich –  Derby County

Out
  Wayne Routledge –  Tottenham Hotspur
  Sándor Torghelle –  Panathinaikos, season loan

References

Notes

Crystal Palace
Crystal Palace F.C. seasons